Mechanize Tour, also named Fear Campaign Tour or Industrial Discipline Tour was a concert tour headlined by American industrial metal band Fear Factory, in support of their 7th studio album, Mechanize.

It was held from December 4, 2009 to December 20, 2010. It was supposed to begin on August 2009, but the dates planned in United Kingdom, Germany, Australia & New Zealand were cancelled, Dino explaining them by more time needed to complete the then-new album. An earlier show in Spain was also cancelled due to legal complications.

The band was supported by Sylosis, After All, Dååth and High on Fire, among others.

Set list

Tour dates

Support acts
Note: Main support acts are in bold.

 Daysend (January 18, 2010)
 Blood Duster (January 27, 2010)
 Sylosis (February 16–19, 2010)
 October File (February 16–19, 2010; cancelled for the Glasgow date)
 After All (February 21–24, 2010; March 6, 2010)
 MAN (February 27-March 5, 2010)
 Neaera (March 7–9, 2010)
 Road to Nowhere (March 13, 2010)
 Winds of Plague (March 22-April 10, 2010)
 Periphery (March 22-April 10, 2010)
 Dirge Within (March 22-April 10, 2010; cancelled for some dates)
 Gojira (April 13–25, 2010)
 Prong (May 16-June 6, 2010)
 All That Remains (June 9–14, 2010; replaced Prong)
 Silent Civilian (May 16-June 14, 2010)
 Thy Will Be Done (May 16-June 14, 2010)

 Dark Rise (June 22, 2010)
 DevilDriver (June 24, 2010)
 Misanthrope Count Mercyful (June 28, 2010)
 36 Crazyfists (July 7–26, 2010)
 Divine Heresy (July 7–26, 2010)
 After the Burial (July 7–26, 2010)
 Baptized in Blood (July 7–26, 2010)
 Coldwar (August 2, 2010)
 Beholder (August 4, 2010)
 Toxic Bonkers (August 9–10, 2010)
 The Sword (September 15–26, 2010)
 Tainted (September 21–22, 2010)
 High on Fire (December 4–20, 2010)
 Dååth (December 7–20, 2010)

References

Fear Factory concert tours
2009 concert tours
2010 concert tours